Troglocoptes is a genus of mites in the family Acaridae.

Species
 Troglocoptes longibursatus Fain & Mahunka, 1990
 Troglocoptes luciae Fain, 1966

References

Acaridae